Oligosemia is an extinct genus of prehistoric salamanders. Only one species is known, Oligosemia spinosa from Libros, Spain.

See also

 Prehistoric amphibian
 List of prehistoric amphibians

References

Cenozoic salamanders
Miocene animals of Europe
Miocene amphibians